The Rockers (ザ・ロッカーズ, Rokkazu, stylized as TH eROCKERS) were a Japanese punk band formed in 1976 in Hakata, North Kyushu, a five-piece band which recorded three albums between 1980 and 1982 (Who, Come On, and Shakin) under Canyon Records. They belonged to the so-called Mentai Rock scene.

Their frontman, Takanori Jinnai, went on to have a two-decade acting career and winning Best Actor accolades at the Japanese Academy Awards on two occasions and became a film director in 2001.

They were featured in the film Rockers (2003 film) by directed by Takanori Jinnai which recorded of the spirit and energy of the early Japanese punk movement, the band splitting up soon after filming was completed. In 2014 the band reformed for the memorial concert of former bassist Jun Hashimoto and started to play irregularly later on. In 2018 Takanori Jinnai and a mostly new line-up started to work on new material and eventually they released a new album, Rock'n Roll in 2019.

Members
 Takanori Jinnai
 Ko-chan (Takashi Tsukamoto)
 Jin (Shunsuke Nakamura)
 Tani (Hiroshi Tamaki)

Films
 Rockers
 Burst City (1982) by Sogo Ishii
 アイデン & ティティ (2004) by Tomorowo Taguchi (田口トモロヲ)

References

Japanese punk rock groups
Pony Canyon artists
Musical groups from Fukuoka Prefecture